John Fairfield Scamman (or Scammon) (October 24, 1786 – May 22, 1858) was a United States representative from Maine.  He was born in Wells, Massachusetts (now in Maine) on October 24, 1786.  He attended the common schools, then engaged in mercantile pursuits.

Biography
He was elected a member of the Massachusetts House of Representatives in 1817, elected a member of the Maine House of Representatives in 1820 and 1821.  He was appointed  collector of customs in Saco from 1829 to 1841.  He was elected as a Democrat to the Twenty-ninth Congress (March 4, 1845 – March 3, 1847).  He was  Chairman of Committee on Expenditures in the US Department of the Treasury (Twenty-ninth Congress).

Scamman served in the Maine State Senate in 1855 and died in Saco on May 22, 1858.  He was interred at Laurel Hill Cemetery.

References

1786 births
1858 deaths
People from Saco, Maine
People from Wells, Maine
Democratic Party members of the United States House of Representatives from Maine
19th-century American politicians